Hemlock Mountain is a mountain located in the Catskill Mountains of New York northeast of Frost Valley. Spruce Mountain is located northwest, Wildcat Mountain is located southwest and Panther Mountain is located northeast of Hemlock Mountain.

References

Mountains of Ulster County, New York
Mountains of New York (state)